Long Ago and Far Away is an album by American singer Tony Bennett that was released by Columbia in 1958

Track listing
"It Could Happen to You" (Van Heusen, Burke) - 2:50
"Ev'ry Time We Say Goodbye" (Porter) - 3:13
"Long Ago and Far Away" (Kern, Gershwin) - 2:55
"It Amazes Me" (Coleman, Leigh) - 3:27
"The Way You Look Tonight" (Kern, Fields) - 3:08
"Be Careful, It's My Heart" (Berlin) - 2:15
"My Foolish Heart" (Washington, Young) - 3:09
"Time After Time" (Cahn, Styne) - 2:55
"Fools Rush In" (Mercer, Bloom) - 2:09
"A Cottage for Sale" (Robison, Conley) - 3:04
"Blue Moon" (Hart, Rodgers) - 2:32
"So Far" (Rodgers, Hammerstein II) - 3:41

Recorded on April 7 (#1, 5, 7), April 8 (#2, 11-12) and April 9 (#3-4, 6, 8-10), 1958.

Personnel
 Tony Bennett – vocals
 Ralph Sharon – piano
 Herbie Mann – flute
 Robert Bai – guitar
 George Van Eps – guitar
 Catherine Gotthoffe – harp
 Dorothy Remsen – harp
 Frank Flynn – vibes 
 Buddy Clark – double bass
 Larry Bunker – drums
 William Exiner – drums
 Frank De Vol – conductor

Strings
 Armond Kaproff (#1, 5, 7), Edgar Lustgarten (#1–2, 5, 7, 11–12), Raphael Kremer – violoncello
 Israel Baker, Robert Barene, Sam Freed, Jacques Gasselin, Ben Gill, Mort Herbert, Dan Lube, William Miller, Lou Raderman, Ambrose Russe, Albert Saparoff, Eudice Shapiro, David Frisina (#2, 11–12), Anatol Kaminsky (#2, 3–4, 6, 8–12) Paul Lowenkron (#2, 3–4, 6, 8–12), Victor Arno (#3–4, 6, 8–10) – violin
 Norman Botnick (#2, 3–4, 6, 8–12), G. R. Menhennick (#3–4, 6, 8–10), Virginia Majewski, Robert Ostrowsky, Joseph Reilich, Milton Thomas – viola

References

1958 albums
Tony Bennett albums
Albums conducted by Frank De Vol
Columbia Records albums